The 2004–05 Sun Hei SC season is the 11th season of Sun Hei SC in Hong Kong First Division League. The team was coached by Malaysian coach Koo Luam Khen.

Squad statistics

Statistics accurate as of match played 31 May 2005

Matches

Competitive

Hong Kong First Division League

Hong Kong Senior Challenge Shield

Hong Kong FA Cup

Hong Kong League Cup

References

Sun Hei SC seasons
Sun Hei